Bran Point is a small headland on the Dorset coast in southern England, about halfway between the small villages of Ringstead to the east and Osmington Mills to the west. There is a picturesque cliff-top path between the two villages via Bran Point.

The name derives from the brown colouring of the rock forming the cliffs of the headland, caused in part by residual oil deposits. The geology of the area is particularly interesting. The coastline in the area is formed from rocks and shingle with exposed cliffs behind. The Middle White Oolite of the Osmington Oolite more visible to the west has descended to beach level here. At the middle of the cliff, there is nodular rubble consisting of calcitized sponge spicules. Higher in the cliff are reddish brown beds containing Trigonia clavellata fossils.

See also
 Geology of Dorset
 Black Head
 Redcliff Point
 White Nothe

References

Headlands of Dorset
Jurassic Coast